The men's marathon event at the 1987 Summer Universiade was held in Zagreb on 19 July 1987.

Results

References

Athletics at the 1987 Summer Universiade
1987